Line 01 (ខ្សែទី១) is a route of the Phnom Penh City Bus network in Phnom Penh, Cambodia.

The line is represented on the official Phnom Penh City Bus map in Green.

Stations

See also
Phnom Penh City Bus
Transport in Phnom Penh
Phnom Penh

References

External links
 Cambodians board Phnom Penh's first public buses in more than a decade, The Guardian 
 Public Bus System Works, But Needs Improvement, Riders Say 
 Official Page of Phnom Penh Municipal Bus Services

Phnom Penh Bus Rapid Transit